Brand "Bram" Evers (16 July 1886 – 7 October 1952) was a Dutch athlete, who competed at the 1908 Summer Olympics in London. He was born in Arnhem, the city where he also died.

In the 400 metres competition, Evers placed third in his preliminary heat and did not advance to the semifinals. He did not finish his initial semifinal heat of the 800 metres event, not advancing to the final in that event. He was also a member of the Dutch relay team which was eliminated in the first round of the medley relay competition.

In the pole vault event he finished 15th. He also participated in the long jump event and in the standing long jump competition but for both contests his results are unknown.

In 1922 he was the interim-coach of Dutch football (soccer) club Vitesse Arnhem for a short while.

References

Sources

External links
 Dutch Olympic Committee

1886 births
1952 deaths
Dutch male sprinters
Dutch male long jumpers
Dutch male pole vaulters
Dutch football managers
SBV Vitesse managers
Olympic athletes of the Netherlands
Athletes (track and field) at the 1908 Summer Olympics
Sportspeople from Arnhem
19th-century Dutch people
20th-century Dutch people